Marty Overweg is an American politician and businessman serving as a member of the South Dakota House of Representatives from the 19th district. A member of the Republican Party, Overweg assumed office on January 6, 2020 after being nominated by Governor Kristi Noem to succeed Kyle Schoenfish, who was appointed to the State Senate.

A resident of New Holland, South Dakota, Overweg owns an agricultural sales company. He and his wife have five children.

References 

Living people
Republican Party members of the South Dakota House of Representatives
People from Douglas County, South Dakota
Year of birth missing (living people)
21st-century American politicians